Macedonian Information Centre (MIC; Macedonian: Македонски информативен центар МИЦ) is an independent news agency in the Republic of North Macedonia. MIC's primary task is providing news, information and analyses to the international community, mainly to foreign governments, foreign embassies, governmental organizations, institutes, international businesses, libraries, various research organizations, news agencies and media abroad about Macedonian politics, economy, society, religion, culture, etc.

External links
Official home page

Mass media companies of North Macedonia